West Virginia Route 84 is an east–west state highway located within Pocahontas County, West Virginia.  The western terminus of the route is at West Virginia Route 92 in Frost. The eastern terminus is at the Virginia state line five miles (8 km) east of Frost, where WV 84 continues east as State Route 84.

Major intersections

References

084
Transportation in Pocahontas County, West Virginia